The 1997–98 Eintracht Frankfurt season was the 98th season in the club's football history. In 1997–98 the club played in the 2. Bundesliga, the second tier of German football. It was the club's 2nd season in the 2. Bundesliga after being relegated from the Bundesliga for the first time. The season ended for Eintracht with promotion to the Bundesliga after winning the 2. Bundesliga.

Friendlies

Indoor soccer tournaments

Dortmund

Frankfurt

Competitions

2. Bundesliga

League table

Results by round

Matches

DFB-Pokal

Squad

Squad and statistics 

|}

Transfers

Summer

In:

Out:

Winter

In:

Out:

Notes

References

Sources

External links
 Official English Eintracht website 
 German archive site
 1997–98 Bundesliga season at Fussballdaten.de 

1997-98
German football clubs 1997–98 season